Billy Luk Wing-Kuen (born 27 June 1982), better known as Luk Wing (often stylized as 6 Wing),  is a Hong Kong rapper, actor, television presenter, and comedian. Luk Wing and C Kwan are members of the hip hop duo FAMA.

Career 

Luk Wing attended the same high school as group mate C Kwan. They were previously part of the hip hop group System Map. Before debuting under FAMA, he taught children's drama classes. After meeting DJ Tommy at a hip hop contest, C Kwan and Luk Wing were signed to TG Management. FAMA's debut album was released November 8, 2002.

In 2006, FAMA released the single "456Wing". A solo by Luk Wing, the single received strong airplay. FAMA reached further mainstream popularity in 2007 with the release of the song "Wind and Water Rising" 風生水起 featuring Feng Shui master Mak Ling Ling.

In July 2009, Luk Wing headlined his own stand-up comedy show at the Sunbeam Theatre.

Luk Wing made his television acting debut in the 2014 TVB drama series Never Dance Alone. Luk Wing and C Kwan are frequent collaborators with television personality Carol Cheung. Together they have hosted the game show Do Did Eat and the travel program Dodo Goes Shopping. Luk Wing, C Kwan, and Cheung are the recipients of the 2016 TVB Anniversary Award for Best Host.

In 2016, Luk Wing portrayed Ted in the drama Two Steps From Heaven. His portrayal as the rebellious Ted was received positively and was nominated for Best Supporting Actor at the 2016 TVB Anniversary Awards. In 2019, he starred in the comedy series My Commissioned Lover and the supernatural series Barrack O'Karma.

Filmography

Television dramas

As Host

Film

References

1982 births
Living people
Hong Kong male rappers